The 2023 Mississippi gubernatorial election will take place on November 7, 2023 to choose the governor of Mississippi. Incumbent Republican Governor Tate Reeves is running for re-election to a second term in office. Primary elections will be held on August 8.

Background 
A socially conservative Southern state, Mississippi is considered safely Republican at the federal level, with both of its U.S. senators and all but one of its U.S. representatives belonging to the Republican Party, with all statewide offices currently being held by Republicans. In the 2020 presidential election, Donald Trump comfortably carried Mississippi by 16 percentage points.

Reeves was first elected in 2019, relatively narrowly defeating then-attorney general Jim Hood, who was the only Democrat elected to statewide office in Mississippi at the time.

Most analysts consider Reeves to be a relatively heavy favorite to win reelection, given the state's partisan lean and the extreme unpopularity of national Democrats in one of the most socially conservative states in the nation. Nonetheless, some consider the race to have the potential to become competitive. Reeves has faced heavy criticism for his poor handling of the Jackson water crisis and for his ties to a welfare corruption scandal, and has the worst approval ratings of any Republican governor in the country. The Democratic front-runner, Brandon Presley, is considered to be a potentially-strong general election candidate; he has represented the Northern district on the Mississippi Public Service Commission since 2008, despite that district having a strong Republican bent, and holds relatively moderate or even conservative views on social issues, thus fitting the state.

Republican primary

Candidates

Declared
David Hardigree, U.S. Army veteran
Tate Reeves, incumbent governor
John Witcher, physician

Declined
Lynn Fitch, Mississippi Attorney General (running for re-election)
Robert Foster, former state representative and candidate for governor in 2019 (running for the DeSoto County Board of Supervisors)
Andy Gipson, Mississippi Commissioner of Agriculture and Commerce (running for re-election)
Philip Gunn, Speaker of the Mississippi House of Representatives
Bill Waller Jr., former Chief Justice of the Mississippi Supreme Court, son of former governor Bill Waller, and candidate for governor in 2019
Michael Watson, Mississippi Secretary of State (running for re-election)
Shad White, Mississippi State Auditor (running for re-election)

Polling

Tate Reeves vs. Bill Waller Jr.

Results

Democratic primary

Candidates

Declared 
 Brandon Presley, Mississippi Public Service Commissioner for the Northern District

Disqualified 
 Bob Hickingbottom, political consultant and Constitution nominee for governor in 2019
 Gregory Wash, songwriter and candidate for governor in 2019

Declined 

Endorsements

Results

Independents

Candidates

Declared 
Gwendolyn Gray, nonprofit executive

Declined 
George Flaggs Jr., mayor of Vicksburg and former Democratic state representative
Bill Waller Jr., former Chief Justice of the Mississippi Supreme Court, son of former governor Bill Waller, and candidate for governor in 2019

General election

Predictions

Endorsements

Polling

Tate Reeves vs. Brandon Presley

Tate Reeves vs. generic opponent

Notes

Partisan clients

References

External links
Official campaign websites
Brandon Presley (D) for Governor
Tate Reeves (R) for Governor

Gubernatorial
2023
Mississippi